Yaroslav Horak (12 June 1927 – 24 November 2020) was an Australian illustrator and comics artist, of ethnic Czech-Russian origin, best known for his work on the newspaper comic strip James Bond.

Biography

Horak was born on 12 June 1927 in Harbin, China, the son of a Czech father and Russian mother. In 1939 his family migrated to Sydney, Australia prior to World War II. He began his career as a portrait painter but switched to illustration for the larger Australian magazine publishers. In 1948 Horak's first accepted comic strips were for Rick Davis (a detective adventure) and The Skyman (a mysterious costumed flyer) in 1948. He then moved to Syd Nicholls' Publications where he worked on Ray Thorpe (an adventure series) and Ripon – the Man from Outer Space (sci-fi). Horak also did comic strips for a number of other Sydney publishers, before he moved to Melbourne where he drew Brenda Starr for Atlas Publications. In 1954 he created The Mask – The Man of Many Faces and an adaptation of the popular children's TV program Captain Fortune for Fairfax publications The Sun-Herald between 1957–1962 and Mike Steele – Desert Rider for Woman’s Day magazine.

Horak then moved to England in 1962, where he also drew adventure stories for D.C. Thomson of Scotland, the scripts being supplied by others. He was the second artist, taking over from John McLusky, for the Daily Express strip James Bond from 1966 to 1977, then for the Sunday Express and the Daily Star from 1977 to 1979 and again from 1983 to 1984. In total Horak worked on 33 James Bond comic strips sequences.

Horak also created the comic series Jet Fury, in addition to working on other comic strips such as Andrea, Cop Shop and Sergeant Pat of the Radio Patrol.

Horak also achieved a degree of popularity during the 1960s when he was employed by Fleetway Publications (later IPC Magazines) to contribute art for 11 of their comic books in the War Picture Library and Battle Picture Library series.

Horak died on 24 November 2020 in Sydney, Australia, after a decade-long struggle with Alzheimer's disease.

War Picture Library
 WPL 214 Rough Justice 1963
 WPL 303 Death Or Dishonour 1965
 WPL 304 Battle Drill 1965
 WPL 315 Cross For Courage 1965
 WPL 323 Passage Of Arms 1966
 WPL 648 The Curse 1971
 BPL 156 The Savage Sands 1964
 BPL 173 The Stronghold 1964
 BPL 190 Killers Code 1965
 BPL 197 Gun Crazy 1965
 BPL 231 Victory Cry 1965

James Bond strips

References

External links
 Horak biography on Lambiek Comiclopedia

1927 births
2020 deaths
Artists from Harbin
Australian illustrators
Australian comics artists
Chinese emigrants to Australia
Australian people of Czech descent
Australian people of Russian descent
Australian expatriates in England